Events from the 1070s in England.

Incumbents
Monarch – William I

Events
 1070
 Winter of 1069–1070 – Harrying of the North: King William I quells rebellions in the North of England following an invasion by Sweyn II of Denmark. Widespread famine follows the devastation wrought.
 Spring – King Sweyn II of Denmark joins English rebels, led by Hereward the Wake, and captures the Isle of Ely in The Fens of eastern England.
 11 April – Archbishop of Canterbury Stigand deposed.
 1 June – Hereward plunders Peterborough Abbey.
 June – Denmark signs a treaty with England; Sweyn and his forces leave the country.
 15 August – Lanfranc appointed as the new Archbishop of Canterbury.
 Invasion of England by Malcolm III of Scotland repelled.
Hugh d'Avranches, 1st Earl of Chester, the first Marcher Lord, invades Wales, capturing parts of Gwynedd.
 Osmund succeeds Herfast as Lord Chancellor; Herfast becomes Bishop of Elmham.
 Rebuilding of Canterbury Cathedral following a fire.
 Rebuilding of York Minster begins.
 Construction of Dudley Castle in the west midlands by Ansculf de Picquigny begins.
 Construction of Richmond Castle in North Yorkshire by Alan Rufus begins.
 Jews from Rouen, in Normandy, settle in England at the invitation of the King.
 1071
 William defeats Hereward the Wake's rebellion on the Isle of Ely.
 Edwin, Earl of Mercia, again rebels against William but is betrayed and killed, leading to the re-distribution of land within Mercia to William's subjects.
 1072
 27 May – the Accord of Winchester establishes the primacy of the Archbishop of Canterbury over the Archbishop of York in the Church of England.
 August – William invades Scotland, reaching the River Tay.
 At Abernethy, King Malcolm III of Scotland submits to William.
 Bishop of Lincoln raised to diocesan status. Construction of Lincoln Cathedral begins.
 1073
 Rebuilding of St Augustine's Abbey in Canterbury.
 1074
Roger de Montgomerie is created Earl of Shrewsbury, and invades Wales, reaching as far as Powys.
 1075
Revolt of the Earls: three earls rebel against William in the last serious act of resistance to the Norman conquest of England.
 August (approx. date) – Council of London reforms Church administration in England. It approves union of the dioceses of Ramsbury and Sherborne into a new Diocese of Salisbury with a new cathedral at Old Sarum, Herman becoming first Bishop of Salisbury.
 First Bishop of Chichester (Stigand of Selsey) consecrated.
 1076
 April – Council of Winchester confirms ecclesiastical authority, insists on celibacy of the clergy and marriage within church.
 31 May – execution of Waltheof II, Earl of Northumbria, for his part in the Revolt of the Earls.
 Approximate date of the Trial of Penenden Heath to settle a land dispute between King William and his half-brother Odo of Bayeux.
 1077 
 The Bayeux Tapestry completed depicting the Norman conquest of England.
 William's son Robert Curthose stages an insurrection against him in Normandy.
 Construction of St Albans Cathedral begins under Abbot Paul of Caen.
 Foundation of the first Cluniac abbey in England, at Lewes.
 First recorded Trial by combat in England.
 1078
 3 June (approx. date) – consecration of Osmund as Bishop of Salisbury. He will introduce the Sarum Rite.
 (approx. date) – construction of the White Tower (Tower of London) begins under the direction of Bishop Gundulf of Rochester.
 Construction of Colchester Castle begins under the direction of Bishop Gundulf of Rochester.
 1079
 January – Robert unhorses William in battle in Normandy.
 William creates the New Forest as a hunting ground.
 Rebuilding of Winchester Cathedral begins.

Births
 1075
16 April – Orderic Vitalis, Benedictine chronicler (died c. 1142)
Approximate date – Gerald de Windsor, noble (died 1135)

Deaths
 1072
 10–11 February – Leofric, first Bishop of Exeter
 c. 21–22 February – Stigand, deposed Archbishop of Canterbury
 1075
 19 December – Edith of Wessex, queen of Edward the Confessor (born c. 1029)
 1076
 31 May – Waltheof II, Earl of Northumbria, last of the Anglo-Saxon earls (born 1050)

References